David Daiches  (2 September 1912 – 15 July 2005) was a Scottish literary historian and literary critic, scholar and writer. He wrote extensively on English literature, Scottish literature and Scottish culture.

Early life
He was born in Sunderland, into a Jewish family with a Lithuanian background—the subject of his 1956 memoir, Two Worlds: An Edinburgh Jewish Childhood. He moved to Edinburgh while still a young child, about the end of World War I, where his father, Rev. Dr. Salis Daiches was rabbi to Edinburgh's Jewish community, and founder of the city's branch of B'nai Brith. He studied at George Watson's College and won a scholarship to University of Edinburgh where he won the Elliot prize. He went to Oxford where he became the Elton exhibitioner, and was elected Fellow of Balliol College in 1936.

Daiches is the father of Jenni Calder, also a Scottish literary historian. His brother was the prominent Edinburgh QC Lionel Henry Daiches. Although Lionel retained the older, traditional pronunciation of their surname as 'dyke-iz' /ˈdaɪ χ (or k) ɪz/, David returned from the USA with the Americanized 'day-ches', /ˈdeɪ  tʃɪz/.
He also had a sister, Sylvia Daiches.

Career
During World War II, he worked for the British Embassy in Washington, DC, producing pamphlets for the British Information Service and drafting (and delivering) speeches on British institutions and foreign policy.

Daiches' first published work was The Place of Meaning in Poetry, published in 1935. He was a prolific writer, producing works on English literature, Scottish literature, literary history and criticism as well as the broader role of literature in society and culture. His The Novel and the Modern World (1939) was well received, and his expertise on the modern period led to his co-editing The Norton Anthology of English Literature (1962). He also wrote the two-volume A Critical History of English Literature and edited the Penguin Companion to Literature – Britain and the Commonwealth (1971). He wrote biographical and critical works on Virginia Woolf, Robert Louis Stevenson, Robert Burns, D. H. Lawrence, John Milton, and Sir Walter Scott. He also wrote two autobiographical volumes, books on Scotch whisky, the King James Bible, and the cities of Edinburgh and Glasgow, a biography of Bonnie Prince Charlie, and a volume of poetry.

Starting at the University of Edinburgh, he had a long and influential career teaching in the UK, the US and Canada. He taught or held visiting posts at Balliol College, the University of Chicago, Cornell University, Jesus College, Cambridge, Indiana University, the University of Minnesota, McMaster University in Canada, Wesleyan University in Connecticut, and the University of California; besides setting up the English Department at the newly founded University of Sussex. From 1979 to 1984 he was President of the Association for Scottish Literary Studies and from 1980 to 1986 he was Director of the Institute for Advanced Studies in the Humanities at Edinburgh University.
Daiches chaired the panel of judges for the Booker Prize in 1980 and was president of the Saltire Society from 1982 to 1986.  He was appointed CBE in the 1991 Birthday Honours.

List of published works
 The Place of Meaning in Poetry (1935)
 New Literary Values; Studies in Modern Literature (1936)
 Literature and Society (1938)
 Poetry and the Modern World: A Study of Poetry in England Between 1900 and 1939 (1940)
 Virginia Woolf (1942)
 Robert Louis Stevenson (1947)
 A Study of Literature (For Readers and Critics) (1948)
 Robert Burns (1950)
 Stevenson and the Art of Fiction (1951)
 A Century of the Essay: British and American (1951)
 Willa Cather – A Critical Introduction (1951)
 Two Worlds : An Edinburgh Jewish Childhood (1956) (memoirs)
 Literary Essays (1956)
 Critical Approaches to Literature (1956)
 The Present Age in British Literature (After 1920) (1958)
 Two Studies: The Poetry of Dylan Thomas, Walt Whitman: Impressionist Prophet (1958)
 Robert Louis Stevenson – a Laurel Reader (1959) editor
 A Critical History of English Literature (1960) two volumes
 The Novel and the Modern World (1960)
 White Man in the Tropics: Two Moral Tales (1962)
 D. H. Lawrence (1963)
 George Eliot: Middlemarch (1963)
 English Literature (1964)
 Milton (1964)
 The Idea of a New University. An Experiment in Sussex (1964) editor
 The Paradox of Scottish Culture: The Eighteenth Century Experience (1964)
 More Literary Essays (1968)
 The King James Version of the English Bible (1968)
 Scotch Whisky: Its Past and Present (1969)
 Some Late Victorian Attitudes (1969) Ewing Lectures
 A Third World (1971) (memoirs)
 Penguin Companion to Literature – Britain and the Commonwealth (1971) editor
 Sir Walter Scott and His World (1971)
 Robert Burns and His World (1972)
 Literature and Western Civilization (1972–76) editor with Anthony Thorlby, six volumes
 Robert Louis Stevenson and His World (1973)
 Bonnie Prince Charlie: The Life and Times of Charles Edward Stuart (1973)
 Moses: Man in the Wilderness (1975) Moses: The Man and the Vision in the US
 Was: A Pastime from Time Past (1975)
 James Boswell and His World (1976)
 Shakespeare: Julius Caesar (1976)
 Glasgow (1977)
 Scotland and the Union (1977)
 Edinburgh (1978)
 The Butterfly and the Cross (1978)
 The Selected Poems of Robert Burns (1979)
 Andrew Fletcher of Saltoun. Selected Political Writings and Speeches (1979) editor
 Literary Landscapes of the British Isles. A Narrative Atlas (1979) with John Flower
 A Companion to Scottish Culture (1981)
 The Avenel Companion to English and American Literature (1981) editor
 Literature and Gentility in Scotland (1982)
 God and the Poets (1984) Gifford Lectures (1983)
 A Hotbed of Genius: The Scottish Enlightenment, 1730–1790 (1986) editor with Jean Jones and Peter Jones
 Let's Collect Scotch Whisky (Jarrold Collectors Series) (1988)
 A Wee Dram: Drinking Scenes from Scottish Literature (1990)
 A Weekly Scotsman and Other Poems (1994)

References

External links

1912 births
2005 deaths
People associated with Edinburgh
People educated at George Watson's College
Immigration to Scotland
Scottish Jews
Scottish people of Lithuanian-Jewish descent
Scottish biographers
Scottish essayists
Scottish literary critics
Scottish memoirists
Scottish scholars and academics
People from Sunderland
Alumni of the University of Edinburgh
Alumni of Balliol College, Oxford
Commanders of the Order of the British Empire
Fellows of Jesus College, Cambridge
Wesleyan University faculty
Scottish literary historians
Scottish Jewish writers
20th-century Scottish poets
Scottish male poets
20th-century essayists
20th-century British male writers
Presidents of the Saltire Society
Scottish academics of English literature